Colonel Cecil Henry Law, 6th Baron Ellenborough,  (23 November 1849 – 22 January 1931), was a British Army officer and a member of the House of Lords.

Baron Ellenborough
Cecil Henry Law was the third son of Henry Spencer Law and Dorothea (daughter of Colonel J. S. Rochfort of Clogrenane, County Carlow). Law was educated at Wellington College, Berkshire, and the Royal Military College Sandhurst, and passed out into the Army in 1869. He succeeded to the peerage on the death of his brother, Edward Law, 5th Baron Ellenborough, in 1915. He was introduced to the House of Lords on 15 February 1916, immediately after that year's King's Speech.

Military career
Law was commissioned as an officer into the 54th Regiment of Foot (from 1881 The Dorsetshire Regiment) in July 1869, was promoted to lieutenant on 28 October 1871, and served in the Second Anglo-Afghan War 1878–1880. Promoted to captain on 24 January 1883, to major on 21 June 1890, and to lieutenant-colonel on 19 November 1897, he commanded the 2nd battalion Dorsetshire Regiment during the Second Boer War in South Africa from 1900 to 1902 where he was present during the Relief of Ladysmith, and the battles of Laing's Nek and the Tugela Heights. For his services in the war, he was mentioned in despatches three times, received the Queen's Medal with five clasps and the King's Medal with two clasps, and was appointed a Companion of the Order of the Bath (CB) in the April 1901 South Africa Honours list (the award was dated to 29 November 1900; he only received the actual decoration from King Edward VII at Buckingham Palace on 24 October 1902). Law was placed on half-pay in August 1902, and retired with the rank of colonel in 1906.

Family and later life
After his retirement from the British Army, Lord Ellenborough took an active interest in local philanthropic and patriotic institutions. He was for many years Chairman of Dorset County Hospital and President of the Dorset Territorial Army Association. Cecil Henry Law married Alice Caroline Astell in 1884, who died in 1916 (daughter of Mr John Harvey Astell of Woodbury Hall, Bedfordshire). On his death in 1931, he was succeeded by his son: Henry Law, 7th Baron Ellenborough.

Ancestry

References

1849 births
1931 deaths
54th Regiment of Foot officers
British Army personnel of the Second Boer War
British people of the Second Anglo-Afghan War
Companions of the Order of the Bath
Deputy Lieutenants of Dorset
Members of the British House of Lords
Cecil
Younger sons of barons